The Grand Master of Artillery or Grand Maître de l'artillerie was one of the Great Officers of the Crown of France during the Ancien Régime.

The position of Grand Master of Artillery replaced the earlier position of Grand Maître des arbalétriers ("Grand Master of the Archers"). It was made a Great Office of the Crown in 1601 by King Henry IV for the benefit of Maximilien de Béthune, duc de Sully.

The Grand Master of Artillery had jurisdiction, at the beginning of the 17th century, over all the officers and the artillery of the French army, as well as oversight over sieges and encampments, the making of gunpowder and cannons and management of the arsenals. At the end of the century, the position became merely honorific, and his duties passed to other more specialized officers, most notably the "surintendant des fortifications".

See also
 Great Officers of the Crown of France
 Maison du Roi

References
This article is based in part on the article Grand maître de l'artillerie de France from the French Wikipedia, retrieved on September 6, 2006.

External links
Great Officers of the Crown

Court titles in the Ancien Régime
Military history of the Ancien Régime